Cocaine is a naturally occurring organic compound, an alkaloid, present in the leaves of the coca plant.
 Cocaine (data page)

Cocaine may also refer to:

Arts and entertainment
 Cocaine (film), a 1922 British crime film directed by Graham Cutts
 The Pace That Kills (1935 film), also known as Cocaine Madness and The Cocaine Fiends, a 1935 film directed by William A. O'Conner
 Cocaine: An Unauthorized Biography, a 2002 book by Dominic Streatfeild
 Cocaine Blues (novel), by Kerry Greenwood (1989)

Music
 Cocaine (album), a 2009 album by Z-Ro
 "Cocaine" (song), a 1976 song by J.J. Cale, later covered by Eric Clapton and Nazareth
 "Cocaine", a poem by Patti Smith in her 1972 book Seventh Heaven
 "Coke'n", a 2002 song by Izzy Stradlin on his album On Down the Road
 "Cocaine Blues",

Other uses
 Cocaine (PaaS), an open source project
 Cocaine (drink), a highly caffeinated energy drink that does not contain the alkaloid cocaine
 Honey Cocaine (born 1992), stage name of the Canadian rap artist Sochitta Sal
 List of cocaine analogues, the structurally and functionally analogous chemical molecules derived from or modified to be in accord with the basic form of cocaine

See also
 Kokane (born 1969), an American hip hop artist otherwise known as Jerry B. Long Jr.
 Cockayne (disambiguation)